Benin Golf Air was an airline based in Cotonou, Benin. It was established and started operations in 2002 and operated regional flights in West Africa. Its main base was Cadjehoun Airport. Benin Golf Air is on the list of air carriers banned from operating within the European Union. As of July, 2012, it is inactive.

Destinations
Benin Golf Air operated regional services from Cotonou to 13 destinations throughout West Africa. Benin Golf Air operated services to the following international scheduled destinations (at September 2007): Abidjan, Bamako, Bangui, Brazzaville, Conakry, Cotonou, Dakar, Douala, Kinshasa, Libreville, Lomé, Malabo, and Pointe-Noire.

Fleet
The Benin Golf Air fleet consists of the following aircraft (as of June 1, 2015):

1 Boeing 737-200

As of June 1, 2015, the average age of the Benin Golf Air fleet is 33.9 years.

See also		
 List of defunct airlines of Benin

References

External links
Benin Golf Air 
Benin Golf Air Fleet

Defunct airlines of Benin
Airlines established in 2002
2002 establishments in Benin
Airlines disestablished in 2012
Companies based in Cotonou